NGC 2197 is an centrally condensed open cluster within the Large Magellanic Cloud, in the Dorado constellation.   It is estimated to be 400 million years old.

References

External links 

Dorado (constellation)
2197
Open clusters